This is a list of Assembly Members (AMs; Welsh: Aelodau'r Cynulliad, ACau) elected to the first National Assembly for Wales at the 1999 election.

Members
 Lorraine Barrett
 Mick Bates
 Peter Black
 Nick Bourne
 Eleanor Burnham
 Rosemary Butler
 Alun Cairns
 Christine Chapman
 Cynog Dafis
 Jane Davidson
 Andrew Davies
 David Davies
 Geraint Davies
 Glyn Davies
 Janet Davies
 Jocelyn Davies
 Ron Davies
 Richard Edwards
 Dafydd Elis-Thomas
 Sue Essex
 Delyth Evans
 Val Feld
 Mike German, Baron German
 Brian Gibbons
 William Graham
 Janice Gregory
 John Griffiths
 Christine Gwyther
 Alison Halford
 Brian Hancock
 Edwina Hart
 Christine Humphreys
 Jane Hutt
 Pauline Jarman
 Ann Jones
 Carwyn Jones
 David Jones
 Elin Jones
 Gareth Jones
 Helen Mary Jones
 Ieuan Wyn Jones
 Peter Law
 Huw Lewis
 David Lloyd
 Val Lloyd
 John Marek
 David Melding
 Alun Michael
 Tom Middlehurst
 Jonathan Morgan
 Rhodri Morgan
 Lynne Neagle
 Alun Pugh
 Jenny Randerson, Baroness Randerson
 Rod Richards
 Peter Rogers
 Janet Ryder
 Karen Sinclair
 Gwenda Thomas
 Owen John Thomas
 Rhodri Glyn Thomas
 Dafydd Wigley
 Kirsty Williams
 Phil Williams

See also
 Government of the 1st National Assembly for Wales (disambiguation)
 1999 National Assembly for Wales election

References

Lists of members of the Senedd